Anna Green is a fictional character on the long-running Channel 4 British television soap opera Hollyoaks, played by actress Lisa M. Kay between September 1999 and 2002.

Strong, intelligent and loyal to her friends, Anna Green went through a tough time in Hollyoaks. Anna arrived in Hollyoaks with her friends Sam Smallwood, Geri Hudson, Alex Bell and Nikki Sullivan. Anna was immediately shocked to discover that her father had been having an affair and it had become front page news because he was a vicar. Sam comforted her over her father’s affair and ended up kissing Anna, as the pair went on to date from there. However, Anna was surprised when Sam accidentally sent a text to Anna revealing that he had spent the night with Nikki. Anna ended up dumping Sam, but was heartbroken when Sam and Nikki made a fresh start together away from Hollyoaks.

Anna was then knocked over by Cindy Cunningham’s car, but was taken to the hospital, where she made a full recovery. Alex was upset that he was infertile and told Anna, and Anna confided it to Geri Hudson who ended up spreading it around Hollyoaks. Alex was upset and took his anger out on Anna and Alex soon realised how bad he had been to Anna. Anna accepted Alex’s apology and the pair finally got back together. However, Anna was shocked when she discovered that she was pregnant, despite believing that Alex was infertile. When Anna told Alex, Alex refused to believe her and accused Anna of being unfaithful. Anna forced Alex to do a second test, and when he did, the hospital admitted to making a mistake and Alex was in fact fertile after all. Alex apologised to Anna, but told her that he did not want the baby and he then offered her money to have an abortion. Anna was left confused and without much support, she had to make a tough decision. Anna decided in the end that she couldn't go through with an abortion, so she decided that when the child was born she would give it up for adoption.

During New Year’s day, Anna gave birth to her child with support from Max Cunningham and Alex, who realised that he wanted to keep the baby. Anna was finally persuaded by Alex to keep the baby, and Alex named him Charlie and they tried to take steps towards life as a family. However, Anna tried to work on her relationship with Alex, but she felt that she couldn't love him any longer and she ended up sleeping with Max. With a guilty conscience, Anna confessed to Alex, and she decided to move in with the Cunningham family with Charlie, despite Alex trying to persuade her to give their relationship another chance. Anna and Max both agreed that they were serious about their relationship and Anna rejected Alex when he asked her to marry him. Anna then had a night out with Max, leaving Alex to baby-sit Charlie, but when the pair returned to collect Charlie from Alex’s flat, Anna realised that Alex was taking Charlie away with him to Hong Kong. Anna made a mad dash to the airport, just in time to catch Alex, and she managed to persuade him to give Charlie back to her. With Alex leaving Hollyoaks for Hong Kong, Anna thought she could build up her relationship with Max by buying a flat together. However, Max shocked Anna when he revealed that he had had far too much responsibility and was not yet ready for commitment. Anna had nothing left in Hollyoaks and decided to leave by going back to her mother's house.

Reception
Lorna Cooper of MSN TV listed Anna as one of soap opera's "forgotten characters".

References

Hollyoaks characters
Television characters introduced in 1999
Female characters in television